Displaying the Body of Saint Bonaventure (French - Exposition du corps de saint Bonaventure) is a 1629 painting by Francisco de Zurbarán, now in the Louvre. Around the body of Saint Bonaventure are figures including James I of Aragon and Pope Gregory X, shown in conversation. It formed part of a series of paintings on the saint's life - the other works are Saint Bonaventure at the Council of Lyon (Louvre), Saint Bonaventure and the Angel (Dresden) and Saint Bonaventure and Saint Thomas Aquinas before a Crucifix (Berlin).

References
 

Paintings in the Louvre by Spanish artists
1629 paintings
Paintings by Francisco de Zurbarán
Death in art
Popes in art
Paintings of Saint Bonaventure